María Marcela Torres Peimbert (born 7 October 1961) is a Mexican politician affiliated with the PAN. She currently serves as Senator of the LXII Legislature of the Mexican Congress representing Querétaro. She also served as Deputy during the LXI Legislature.

References

1961 births
Living people
Members of the Senate of the Republic (Mexico)
Members of the Chamber of Deputies (Mexico)
Women members of the Senate of the Republic (Mexico)
Politicians from Querétaro
National Action Party (Mexico) politicians
Politicians from Mexico City
21st-century Mexican politicians
21st-century Mexican women politicians
Women members of the Chamber of Deputies (Mexico)
Senators of the LXII and LXIII Legislatures of Mexico